Sandy Eisenberg Sasso is the first woman to have been ordained a rabbi in Reconstructionist Judaism. She was ordained by the Reconstructionist Rabbinical College in Philadelphia, on May 19, 1974. She is also the author of many children's books on religious topics.

Biography

Youth and early life
Sasso was born in 1947 in Philadelphia, Pennsylvania. In her youth, she was very involved in her Philadelphia Reform congregation and began to consider entering the rabbinate at 16 years old, though she knew that such a role had never been open to women. During this period she studied at Gratz College.

Rabbinical school
In the fall of 1969, Sasso joined the Reconstructionist Rabbinical College's second class of rabbinical students. While in school, Sandy Eisenberg married her classmate, Dennis Sasso, making them the first rabbinical couple in Jewish history. As one of the few women rabbinical students, Sasso naturally became a leader in defining women's changing roles within Judaism. Sasso holds title to many firsts as a female rabbi.

Rabbinical life
Sasso served as rabbi of the Manhattan Reconstructionist Congregation and, from 1977 until 2013, as rabbi along with her husband at the congregation Beth-El Zedeck in Indianapolis, making the Sassos the world's first couple to serve jointly as rabbis.

Sasso appeared in a 2005 documentary, titled And the Gates Opened: Women in the Rabbinate, which features stories of and interviews with her, rabbi Sally Priesand, and rabbi Amy Eilberg.

On December 6, 2010, at Temple Reyim in Newton, Massachusetts, Sandy Eisenberg Sasso met for the first time with Sally Priesand, the first Reform female rabbi, Amy Eilberg, the first Conservative female rabbi, and Sara Hurwitz, considered by some to be the first Orthodox female rabbi. They and approximately 30 other women rabbis lit Chanukah candles and then spoke about their experiences in an open forum.

On June 3, 2012, Priesand, Sasso, Eilberg, and Hurwitz met again, this time at Monmouth Reform Temple at a celebration honoring the four first women rabbis to be ordained in their respective movements, and the 40th anniversary of Priesand's ordination.

In May 2013, Sasso retired as senior rabbi of Beth-El Zedeck.

Works

Children's books
 God's Paintbrush, illustrated by Annette C. Compton, Jewish Lights Publishing (Woodstock, VT), 1992.
 In God's Name, illustrated by Phoebe Stone, Jewish Lights Publishing (Woodstock, Vermont), 1994.
 But God Remembered: Stories of Women from Creation to the Promised Land, Jewish Lights Publishing (Woodstock, Vermont), 1995.
 A Prayer for the Earth: The Story of Naamah, Noah's Wife, illustrated by Bethanne Andersen, Jewish Lights Publishing (Woodstock, Vermont), 1996.
 God in Between, illustrated by Sally Sweetland, Jewish Lights Publishing (Woodstock, Vermont), 1998.
 For Heaven's Sake, illustrated by Kathryn Kunz Finney, Jewish Lights Publishing (Woodstock, Vermont), 1999.
 God's Paintbrush, Jewish Lights Publishing (Woodstock, Vermont), 1999.
 What Is God's Name?, Jewish Lights Publishing (Woodstock, Vermont), 1999.
 God Said Amen, Jewish Lights Publishing (Woodstock, Vermont), 2000.
 Cain and Abel: Finding the Fruits of Peace, illustrated by Joani Keller Rothenberg, Jewish Lights Publishing (Woodstock, Vermont), 2001.
 Naamah, Noah's Wife, illustrated by Bethanne Andersen, Jewish Lights Publishing (Woodstock, Vermont), 2002.
 Adam and Eve's First Sunset: God's New Day, illustrated by Joani Keller Rothenberg, Jewish Lights Publishing (Woodstock, Vermont), 2003.
 Abuelita's Secret Matzahs, Emmis Books (Cincinnati), 2005.
 Butterflies under Our Hats, Paraclete Press (Orleans), 2006.
 The Shema in the Mezuzah: Listening to Each Other, Jewish Lights Publishing, 2012.
 Regina Persisted: An Untold Story, illustrated by Margeaux Lucas, Apples & Honey Press, 2018.

Other works
 Call Them Builders: A Resource Booklet about Jewish Attitudes and Practices on Birth and Family Life, Reconstructionist Federation of Congregations and Havurot (New York), 1977.
 The Voices of Children, Co-editor with Siddur Kol HaNoar, Reconstructionist Press, 2005.
 God's Echo – Exploring Scripture with Midrash, Paraclete Press (Orleans), 2010.
 "How Jewish Women Have Come to Read the Bible: The Creating of Midrash" in The Sacred Calling: Four Decades of Women in the Rabbinate, CCAR Press, 2016.

Awards and honors
Sasso has been honored throughout her career:
 Honorary Doctor of Humanities, DePauw University, 1986.
 Special Merit award, Vermont Book Publishers, 1992, for God's Paintbrush.
 Children's Books of Distinction Award finalist, 1994, for In God's Name.
 Best books of the year honor, Publishers Weekly, 1995, for But God Remembered: Stories of Women from Creation to the Promised Land.
 Best books of the year honor, Publishers Weekly, 1996, for A Prayer for the Earth.
Sagamore of the Wabash award, Governor of the State of Indiana, 1995.
 Named among Influential Women in Indiana, Indianapolis Business Journal, 1997.
 Honorary D.H.L., Butler University, Indianapolis, 1999.
 Honorary Doctor of Divinity, Reconstructionist Rabbinical College, 1999.
 Honorary degree, Christian Theological Seminary, 2000.
 Helen Keating Ott Award for Outstanding Contribution to Children's Literature, 2004.
National Jewish Book Award in the Illustrated Children's Book category for The Shema in the Mezuzah: Listening to Each Other, 2012. Illustration by Joani Keller Rothenberg.
 The Doctor of Humane Letters, honoris causa, Hebrew Union College-Jewish Institute of Religion, 2013.
 The art exhibit “Holy Sparks”, which opened in February 2022 at the Heller Museum and the Skirball Museum, featured 24 Jewish women artists, who had each created an artwork about a female rabbi who was a first in some way. Debra Band created the artwork about Sasso.

See also
Timeline of women rabbis

Notes

References

External links 
 Information on Rabbi Sandy Eisenberg Sasso’s books at Jewish Lights (publisher)
 Biography at Beliefnet
 Children's Spirituality, an Interview,
 Explorefaith interview Rabbi Sandy Eisenberg Sasso, 2007.
 First women rabbis in U.S. celebrate Hanukkah at historic event, December 7, 2010.

Videos
Videos produced by Sonia Sarah Lipsyc director of Aleph CSUQ, and Abigail Hirsch  a Film Producer with Rabbi Sandy Eisenberg Sasso at Dorshei Emet Synagogue, Montreal,Canada:

Further reading
 Nadell, Pamela S., "Women Who Would Be Rabbis: A History of Women's Ordination, 1889-1985" in Jewish Women's Life.

1947 births
Living people
American children's writers
American Reconstructionist rabbis
The Indianapolis Star people
Jewish American writers
Jewish women writers
Writers from Indianapolis
Reconstructionist women rabbis
Writers from Philadelphia
Writers from New York City
American women children's writers
1974 in Judaism
20th-century American rabbis
21st-century American rabbis
20th-century American women
21st-century American women
Reconstructionist Rabbinical College alumni